is a railway station in Edogawa City, Tokyo, Japan. Its station number is S-19. The station opened on 14 September 1986.

History
 14 September 1986 - The station opened.
 18 March 2007 - Started to use IC cards "PASMO".
 9 June 2018 - Started to use platform screen doors.

Platforms
Mizue Station consists of a single island platform served by two tracks.

Surrounding area
The station is located underground in the middle of a residential area. Points of interest include:
 Tōbu Friend Hall
 Mizue Daiichi Hotel
 Tōbu Citizen's Hall
 Lapark Mizue (shopping center)

Connecting bus service
Keisei Bus: Mizue-Eki
 Shinko 71: for Shin-Koiwa Station via Shinozaki Station
 Ko 72: for Koiwa Station via Edogawa Hospital
 Ko 73: for Koiwa Station, Edogawa Sports Land via Shinozaki-kaidō
 Ko 76: for Koiwa Station, Edogawa Sports Land via Shibamata-kaidō
 No Number: for Tokyo Rinkai hospital via Ichinoe Station and Kasai Station (To operate on weekdays and the second and forth Saturdays)
 No Number: for Icinoe Station (To operate on weekend)

Line
 Tokyo Metropolitan Bureau of Transportation - Toei Shinjuku Line

References

External links

 Tokyo Metropolitan Bureau of Transportation: Mizue Station 

Railway stations in Japan opened in 1986
Railway stations in Tokyo